Taula is a type of prehistoric monument on Menorca that gets its name from the Catalan word for 'table',

Taula may also refer to:

Taula (Tonga), an island in the Vava'u group of Tonga
Durio graveolens or taula
Taula, a village in Oncești Commune, Bacău County, Romania

See also
Tual (disambiguation)
Tuala (disambiguation)
Tualao, a town in Negros Oriental Province, the Philippines 
Tualeu, a village in West Timor, East Nusa Tenggara Province, Indonesia